Fifth Third Center is a skyscraper located in downtown Cincinnati, Ohio, in the U.S. state of Ohio on Fountain Square. It is currently the fifth-tallest building in Cincinnati. It was designed by Harrison & Abramovitz and completed in 1969. The building serves as the corporate headquarters for Fifth Third Bank.

On September 6, 2018, the building was the site of a mass shooting, in which four people were killed, including the suspect. Two others were also injured in the shooting.

See also
List of tallest buildings in Cincinnati

References

Bank company headquarters in the United States
Skyscraper office buildings in Cincinnati
1969 establishments in Ohio
Office buildings completed in 1969